The Ghoryakhel also known as ghoriah khel and Bar Durranis by Ahmad Shah Abdali sometimes referred as Ghori by some authors is a Pashtun supertribe which consists of tribes led by the son of Kand, son of Kharshbun, son of Sarban, and son of Qais Abdur Rashid, who lived in Ghwara Marghay Arghistan Qandahar but mostly settled in Ghazni on the basin of Tarnak River and Nangarhar, Logar, Kabul, Kunar, Paktia, Kunduz,Zabul,Herat of Afghanistan while S. Daudzai also Resides in Hilmand and are also living in Kabul, Afghanistan, which is the largest Pashtun tribe living in Kabul for Century.

This tribe has also settled in Pakistan, Khyber-Pakhtunkhwa, Peshawar, Charsada, Mardan, Nowshehra, Khyber, Kurram, Mohmand, Malakand, Swat Districts and settled between 15th and 16th century. The largest tribe belonging to the Ghoryakhel confederacy is Momand and second-largest his brother Daudzai, son of Daulatyar while other tribes belonging to the confederacy include, Mulagori, Shilmani, Halimzai, Zakhil known by Zakhilwal, Tarakzai, Khawezai,HazarBuz.They are also known as Bar Durranis (Upper Durranis) a title given by Ahmad Shah Abdali. The legendary Pashto Poet Rahman Baba also belonged to Momand tribe of Ghoryakhel.

According to the Pata Khazana Pashtun History Book written by Abdulhai, Habibi Kharshbun and Sharkhbun are brothers, of who Kharshbun had three sons, Kand, Zamand and Kasi, while Sharkhbun had six sons, Urmar, Babar, Baraich, Miana, Tareen and Sheerani. Kand had two sons, Ghoryakhel and Khakhykhel. Zamand had five sons, of which Muhammadzai and Kheshgi being the more popular among them. Kasi had eleven sons. Shinwari and Zhamaryani are the most popular.

Ghoryakhel had four sons: 1st son Khalil; 2nd son Daulatyar; 3rd Zeerani;and 4th Chamkani, who is the youngest son. Many historians mention in different Pashto and Dari books about Zeerani Pashtun tribe settled in Nangarhar Province, Laghman Province, Badakhshan Province in Afghanistan and majority people speak Dari  and Pashto languages because of close relation and cross marriages with Tajiks. Daulatyar had two sons Momand, Daudzai, and other tribes like Mulagori, Shilmani, Halimzai, Zakhil known by Zakhilwal, Tarakzai, Khawezai.

Wars with the British
As the Sikhs never controlled the Ghoryakhel tribes to surrender them under the Sikh control. After the killing of the Best Sikh General Hari Singh Nalwa by the tribesmen of Ghoryakhel, Shinwari, Afridi along with Afghan General Wazir Akbar Khan Son of the Emir Dost Muhammad Khan A mistaken retreat of the Afghan General due to traitors or Agents who gave false information to the Afghan Generals, the tribesmen also returned and continued raiding on the Sikhs looting their traders attacking their Posts. The Sikhs were only limited to the wall city and Fort to control. The British defeated the Sikh empire and Captured Peshawar but in this region, the British also faced a similar problem that the Sikhs were facing. In these tribes, the Ghoryakhel was the key tribe that fought against the British. After the Capture of Peshawar the British tried to subdue the Ghoryakhels in Peshawar due to their continuous raids on the Sikhs and after Sikhs it continues in the time of British in July 1864 The British Marched to Tappa Mohmand and Attacked Dawizai which was repulsed by the Ghoryakhels in 1865 the British sacked the village of AhmadKhel and BazidKhel. In the same year, the Ghoryakhels looted the British Troops by attacking their posts and base in Saddar and returned to home.In first Anglo-Afghan War the Ghoryakhels helped Afghanistan and announced war Against the British many Tribesmen left for Afghanistan to Fight for them many managed to loot the supply wagons and blocking their way making troubles for the British as much as they can. The supreme chief of the Ghoryakhels were from the Shahindagan (The Shahs) or (The Kings when they settled their this village was named after them) Daudzai Sent troops to Kabul secretly to assist the Emir which was then revealed by the Afghan Emir. Daudzai continued his raids on the British Supply lines and troops that resulted in the British retreat and the Afghan victory. Daudzai continued these raids and small skirmishes were happening between the British and Afghans,British sacking Villages,Afghan looting and raiding Britishs until 2nd Anglo-Afghan War in which Ghoryakhel Under the son of Daudzai again supported the Emirate of Afghanistan. The demarcation of the Durrand line In 1893 was rejected by the GhoryaKhels which further angry the British Raaj. The first major battle was fought in the fields of Bahadur Kalay In January 1895 
in which Pashtun tribesmen defeated the British and maintained their independence the British withdrew to the fort Bala hisar. In 1897 the Ghoryakhels attacked the Walled City Peshawar though unsuccessful and returned. In the same year the Ghorya khel sent their tribesmen to Saragarhi to aid Afridi tribe and Orakzai. In 1898 the second battle of Badar Kalay was fought in which British Indian Punjab regiment was again defeated with the loses of 500 on the other hand Pashtun lost 79 men. These raids continued until the 3rd Anglo-Afghan War in which the Ghoryakhels sided with Afghanistan and fought from the Afghanistan side against the British. the Last chief of the Daudzai clan and Ghoryakhels of Shahindagan (his name is unknown because he disappeared)   His father designated him for Chieftainship of Ghoryakhels and Daudzai after him. After his father's death, he was abroad and his brothers started conflict among themselves for Chieftainship of Ghoryakhel tribes Khalil, Daudzai, Mohmand, Chamkani etc. ending the Ghoryakhel supremacy and tribal Chieftainship.

Unacknowledged from these internal matters, 
Farid khan Daudzai fought bravely in the campaign of Parachinar was one of the key generals from Afghan side. It is said that 4000 British Troops attacked Afghans where Afghan positions were Too Weak Afghan troops numbering 564 but Farid got the upper hand on the British sides Whenever the British attack the Afghans. He fought with his men side-by-side which boosted their morale and He diffused 4 British attacks proving his war capability but the treaty of Rawalpindi between Afghanistan and British Raaj upset the Ghoryakhels. In 1924 the Battle of Sheenday (Shahindagan) (Ghorya khel victory),1926 sack of Jahangir Abad (British victory), 1926 Surizai campaign (British victory),1926 Urmar Campaign 1927 Azakhel operation.

Battle of Sarband
After the Arresting of the Bacha Khan and a Massacre in Qissa Khwani done by the British the GhoryaKhel and Afridi Collision forces met with the British Indian troops in Sarband, Peshawar. The British troops formed their line from Pishtakhara to Sarband while on the front side the Pashtuns lined their tribemens from Sheikh Muhammadi, Peshawar to Suleiman Khel. The British numbering 2431 Raaj troops Majority Sikhs and the Pashtuns tribes numbering 1452 (estimated numbers) Tribemens the Battle begans at Morning When the Tribesmens were offering Morning Dawn prayer the British Indian troops Opened fire on the Pashtuns the Pashtun reserve guards successfully defended their main tribal Army. The battle continued at 11 Am a Pashtun tribesmen from Ghoryakhel Crossed the Hill and Exploded the dynamites on the Post on the Hills Capturing the key area in the battlefield in Sheikh Muhammadi. Fighting continue until the main Commander of the British pm the British Raaj Army was totally routed.

Results
The Results of the Battle was Bacha Khan was released, Ghoryakhel tribe maintained their Independent life, No territorial Changes Internationally, British and Sikh losses 2000+ soldiers while the Pashtun losses were less than 30 men.

Aftermath
The British never attacked the Ghoryakhels as in major battle. While the Ghoryakhel maintained their Tribal Freedom and did not stop to raid the British. The Pashtun raiders gave too much damage to the British specially during World War II.

Campaign of Mohmand

Tribal wars and migration

Ghoryakhel tribe was the most powerful Afghan tribe. The first recorded Ghoryakhel tribe is that of Niazi. In arsh Darweza, it is said that once in the area of the Niazi, a Ghoryakhel man was killed in the mosque when the news approached to the Tribal chief of the Ghorya Khel Amaan Shah declared war on the Niazi. The Battle was fought in today's Paktia, Afghanistan in which Niazi were decisively defeated and were swooped out of Afghanistan. the Ghoryakhel conquered Paktia. In 15CE, Yousafzai migrated to Swabi and other regions. At the end of 15CE, many tribes migrated to today's KPK and thus this area was called Pukhtunkhwa. In b/w 16th to 17th or before The Ghorya khel chasing a tribe first to Kandhar, then to Quetta, then to Zhob and Karak where a battle was fought, and again Ghorya khel were victorious. Seeing the riches of the Peshawar, they returned to their lands and prepared for a battle to conquer Peshawar. In response, a massive tribal army of the Yousafzai, Niazi, Jadoon, Mohammadzai, UthmanKhel, Dilzaak, Tarakai, Omarzai, Khwazakhel, Surizai, Tanoli, Lodhi and Hindkowan people was prepared to battle in the outskirts of Peshawar. Ghorya Khel, under their tribal chiefs Zmaray and Khukhah, crossed the Khyber pass where they were welcomed by the Shinwari and Afridi tribes. In late November, they reached Jamrud, where a battle was fought. In this battle, the allied forces were defeated and lost their 30,000 men. Ghorya Khel entering into Peshawar chasing the Niazi as they were their old enemies and swipe out them to Mianwali. Akhund describes that when this news reached other tribes most of them said, "They were mad or fools that they confronted the Ghoryakhels If they were not Muslims then every man of their against tribe in this battle would be killed. By God, It was punishment to them".

War with Dilzak
The Dilzak tribe was cut off from the main Afghan tribes in the past because of close marriages between Dilzak and Hindkowan After Afghan Tribe Yousafzai completely take over the Dilzak in Pukhtunkhwa region Dilzak tribe acted as an allied tribe of Yousafzai as the Dilzak tribe became a weak tribe because of their marriages they were cut off from the main Afghan tribes So that they have no choice but to surrender to the Yousafzai. After the decisive victory of the GhoryaKhels against the Allied forces. The Dilzak tribe seeking to expand attacked the area of the GhoryaKhels. Ghoryakhels did not respond to this attack as they thought it is just a minor problem because the Dilzak understood as a weak tribe. After this the Dilzak attacked the Swat against the Yousafzai and Captured some areas. Yousafzai called upon the Ghoryakhels. Ghorya Khels And Yousafzai were Cousins tribes. The Ghoryakhel marched towards the Swat and informed the Yousafzai chiefs The Yousafzai were withdrawing further to the North as a message came to the Yousafzai chief that the Ghoryakhel has crossed the Swat and are a few minutes away listening to the News Yousafzai tribe marched to the South. Ghoryakhel Khel Attacked the Dilzaks in which the Dilzaaks were defeated. Dilzak Regrouped in the Shangla Where They were again defeated by the GhoryaKhels In this battle the Dilzaki Chief was Killed and his head was sent to the Yousafzai Chief. The Ghoryakhel were returning to their areas attacked by Mohammadzai and Kheshgi tribes the Ghoryakhels Khel sent a letter to the Yousafzai but the Yousafzai did not come for help. Although this raid was repulsed by the GhoryaKhels this created a series of Wars with Yousafzai.

In future, the Ghoryakhels and Yousafzai and allies fought 27 battles in which 16th battles were won by Yousafzai which was a little skirmish while 11 battles were won by the Ghoryakhel from 1st to 15th and from 17th to 27th. The most important battle was during the chief of Yousafzai Gaju Khan and Chief of Ghoryakhel Hyeose in which 10,000 Yousafzai were defeated by the 4000 Ghoryakhel conquering today's Mohmand agency. Gaju Khan feared from Ghoryakhel and never fought a war against the Ghoryakhels. After this battle, the Khattak and Ghoryakhel were in alliance and conquered Nowshera from Yousafzai and Kheshgi tribes. But after that, the Ghoryakhel and the Yousafzai tribe make an alliance against the Mughals and this alliance was never broken and resulted in the fall of the Mughal empire.

History

Pashtuns are said to be Scythians or Hephthalites or Israelites or early Parthians, etc. Meanwhile, Pashtuns are classified as Eastern Iranian group of the Indo-Iranian people. The language that Pashtuns (Pukhtuns, Pakhtuns, Afghans) speak Pashto (Pukhto or Pakhto) is classified as Eastern Iranian languageor a Saka language and itself to be the part of the larger Indo-European language. In the folk tales and traditions Ghorya Khel tribe traces their ancestry to a King called Atlas (Ateas) and Prouthwa (Bartatua). Ghorya Khel is a pure Afghan tribe. They have been lived in Ghor, Kandahar, Zabul, Mazar Sharif, Balkh, Kunduz, Helmand, Sistan and Farah. while the concept of the son of kand is disagreed by many historians that it is just a story. If it is, then Kands grandfather Qais Abdur Rasheed have also his tribesmen, then who were the historians that deny that it is just a story. If you want to learn more about the history of Pashtun you can do so by clicking on this link Pashtuns.

Prominent Figures

Hussain Bakhsh Kausar Ghoryakhel was a prominent leader of Abdul Ghaffar Khan Khudai Khidmatgars hailed from Peshawar. He was a preeminent linguist and philologist of the 20th century in the greater Pashtun territories. He died in Peshawar in the 1990s.

Sheikh Kamal-uddin Daudzai was also from Ghorya Khel tribe Daudzai tribe and Mohmands along With khalils  who revolted against the Mughals with many others tribesmen of Ghorya Khel tribe along with him who fought under Kamal Khan Daudzai. Sheikh Kamal Daudzai killed many Mughals in the battle of Peshawar. After this battle, the Mughal position in Pukhtunkhwa and Afghanistan became weak. After this battle, Shah Jehan was totally shocked and tried to regain complete Mughal supremacy but failed several times by only holding the area of the Gandhari people (Hindkowans).Aurangzeb Alamgir, after becoming the new Padishah, confronted the Pashtuns in the northwest and was defeated by the Pashtuns. Darya Khan Afridi, Aimal Khan Mohmand, Mubarak Khalil and Rostam Khan Daudzai were the main figures in this battle. Mughal losses were estimated from 20,000 to 40,000 troops, while the Pashtun losses were less than 5000. Like the other tribes, Ghoryakhel also never accepted the Ranjeet Singh rule and killed about 10000 Sikh in little skirmishes. Meanwhile, the Sikhs controlled the forts and Hindkowan walled city; also, the British fought the Battle of Sarband in response to the arresting of Bacha Khan. 
Mohammad Omar Daudzai, Rahman Baba Afghanistan National Poet along with Khushal Baba, Abdul Hameed Momand, Master Ghayas Ahmad Khan First Pashto Qaida Writer of NWFP.

According to Sir Olaf Caroe mentioned in his book (The Pathans),  that the Maseed or Mehsud most powerful in non-Afghan tribes, and the Ghoryakhel are t, Master Ghayas Ahmad who wrote first Pashto Qaida for NWFP of British India ost powerful in Afghan tribes. Ghoryakhel and Khakhykhel are the largest Pashtoon Sarbani tribes in northwest or Khyber Pukhtoonkhwa of Pakistan and Afghanistan.

Ghoryakhel tribes
Khalil
Chamkani tribe
Mohmand
Mulagori
Shilmani
Halimzai
Hazarbuz
Daulatzai (Another name for descendant of Daulatyar)

See also
 Pashtun tribes
 Pashtun people
 Khalil (Pashtun tribe)
 Qais Abdur Rashid
 Ghoriwala

References

Sarbani Pashtun tribes